The 14th Army was a World War II field army of the German Army.

History

Poland
The 14th Army was activated on 1 August 1939 with General Wilhelm List in command and saw service in Poland until the end of the Polish campaign on 13 October 1939.

Italy
The 14th Army was reactivated for the defence of Italy in late 1943 when its headquarters was created using the headquarters personnel of Army Group B which had been abolished when Albert Kesselring was given command of all Axis troops in Italy. 14th Army was initially responsible for the defence of Rome and dealing with any amphibious landings the Allies might make to the rear of the German 10th Army, which was fighting on the defensive lines south of Rome.

The 14th Army faced the Allied amphibious landings at Anzio in January 1944 and after the Allied breakthrough in May 1944 took part in the fighting retreat to the Gothic Line. The German armies in Italy finally surrendered on 2 May 1945 after being defeated during the Allies' Spring offensive.

Commanders

See also
14th Army (German Empire) for the equivalent formation in World War I

Notes

14
Military units and formations established in 1939
Military units and formations disestablished in 1945
1939 establishments in Germany
Military units and formations disestablished in 1939
Military units and formations established in 1943